ETO may refer to:

Science and technology
 Emitter turn off thyristor, a semiconductor device
 Ethylene oxide, an organic compound
 RUNX1T1, a gene
 Efforts to Outcomes, software produced by Social Solutions

Sports
 ETO-SZESE Győr FKC, a Hungarian handball club 
 Győri Audi ETO KC, a Hungarian women's handball club
 ETO Park, a multi-use stadium in Győr, Hungary
 Stadion ETO, the predecessor of ETO Park

Other
 Electro-technical officer, on a merchant ship
 Engineer to order, in supply chain management
 English Touring Opera, an opera company in the United Kingdom
 Eton language, a Bantu language
 European Theater of Operations, United States Army, an American theater of operations in World War II
 Earth-Trisolaris Organization, an organization in the novel The Three-Body Problem

See also
 Eto, a Japanese name